Jim Carruthers (December 4, 1940 – July 22, 2020) is a former member of the Arizona House of Representatives from January 1997 until January 2005. He was first elected to the House in November 1996, representing District 5, and was re-elected to that same district in 1998 and 2000. After redistricting in 2002, he ran for re-election in District 24 and won. Due to Arizona's term limit law, he was unable to run for re-election in 2004.

He died on July 22, 2020.

References

1940 births
2020 deaths
Republican Party members of the Arizona House of Representatives
21st-century American politicians
People from Alamosa, Colorado